Boparai  is a village in Bhulath Tehsil in Kapurthala district of Punjab State, India. The village is administrated by a Sarpanch, who is an elected representative.

Demography 
According to the report published by Census India in 2011,Boparai has 424 houses with the total population of 2,001 persons of which 1,021 are male and 980 females. Literacy rate of Boparai is 78.63%, higher than the state average of 75.84%.  The population of children in the age group 0–6 years is 190 which is 9.50% of the total population.  Child sex ratio is approximately 652, lower than the state average of 846.

Population data 

As per census 2011, 564 people were engaged in work activities out of the total population of Boparai which includes 503 males and 61 females. According to census survey report 2011,  57.98% workers (Employment or Earning more than 6 Months) describe their work as main work and 42.02% workers are involved in Marginal activity providing livelihood for less than 6 months.

Caste 
The village has schedule caste (SC) constitutes 28.74% of total population of the village and it doesn't have any Schedule Tribe (ST) population.

List of cities near the village 
Bhulath
Kapurthala 
Phagwara 
Sultanpur Lodhi

Air travel connectivity 
The closest International airport to the village is Sri Guru Ram Dass Jee International Airport.

References

External links
 Villages in Kapurthala
 List of Villages in Kapurthala Tehsil

Villages in Kapurthala district